Ananas is a plant genus in the family Bromeliaceae. It is native to South America. The genus contains Ananas comosus, the pineapple.

Species
The genus Ananas includes only two species:

Gallery

References

External link

 
Bromeliaceae genera
Pineapples
Taxa named by Philip Miller